Torre de Miguel Sesmero is a municipality located in the province of Badajoz, Extremadura, Spain (Europe).

Currently being built in a large area of the municipality, the second solar-thermal plant biggest in Europe, so that these people contributes greatly renewable energy activities to help preserve the environment.

Located on Ruta de las Cruces (Itinerary Crosses), designed to raise awareness of the chapels, churches and religious buildings built on the region's Llanos de Olivenza. It is within the Judicial District of Olivenza.

History 

The origin of Torre de Miguel Sesmero, could be Celtic, giving it the name Saluxtogi 2,600 years ago. After a settlement was Roman giving rise to another name: Turrilux.

The stories tell that the town's name was due for a tower built to defend the people in the wars against Portugal, which subsequent to these conflicts, the town was deserted.

They also say that in medieval times, Don Miguel Pico found a treasure in the land of the people, and given that Don Miguel was sexmero (land dealer), they named in their honor and the people had repopulation. In 1531 had only 332 inhabitants.

It also relates the origin of its name to a tower located between the village houses at the edge of the square, which had to be part of a fort which was demolished around 1841.

Formerly known as Tower's Almendral, since it depended on the village. Both villages held a contest in the 7th century of which has little documentation.

It was founded in the 14th century, around the year 1392 and this is when it is given the name Torre de Miguel Sesmero. Have found documents confirming that the village's land were the Bishop of Badajoz.

The designation of Villa was awarded 1635 upon payment of 11,000 ducats Felipe IV and 1465 joined with Almendral the Ducado de Feria with a real gift.

Between the months of September to October 1643, the Portuguese troops under the command of the Duke of Obidos, wanted to besiege Badajoz, but decided to abandon its efforts to wipe out some border towns, including Torre de Miguel Sesmero, achieving a state of fear throughout the area caused many villagers to leave the village and the surrounding region.

In the fall of the Francisco Franco's dictatorship the locality is in county constitutional in the region of Extremadura. From 1834 was integrated into the Judicial District of Olivenza.

In the census of 1842 had 259 households and 970 residents. His coat was adopted on February 27, 1986.

Notably, in Torre de Miguel Sesmero was one of the First Workers' Congresses in 1902 saying the strikes of laborers looking for work improvements. Home to a major focus of federal Republicans have been the book of Manuel Díaz Ordóñez and Maria Jesus Milan Agudo, Press and rural republicanism in Badajoz twentieth century. Memory chips.. Publications Department of the Diputación de Badajoz, Badajoz. 2009. . VIII awarded the prize Arturo Barea (2008).
 
Said Vicente Navarro del Castillo, 14 inhabitants of Torre de Miguel Sesmero left for the conquest of America, among them being the most important Bartolomé Martínez Menacho, who play the following positions church Vicar of the cathedral chapter of Lima ( Peru), Bishop of Panama and the archbishop of Santa Fe de Bogota (Colombia).

The conquest of America

Many were those who traveled to America in the early discovery. In this village there were also others, such Torreño:
 Pedro Benitez, son of Alonso Durán and María Alonso. He had the license to travel to India on April 12, 1527.
 Juan de Cabal, son of Juan Gallego and Catalina Pérez. He had the license to go to India on August 18, 1517.
 Pedro Carvajal, son of Christopher and Catherine Perez Carvajal. Was very poor. Went to Mexico and married a daughter of Bartholomew Stewart, niece of Alonso Stewart. In 1547 he thought moving to Peru with his wife and two children, then tried to do in Guatemala and was not allowed.
 Alonso Gallego, 36 years old, went to Costa Rica in issuing Artieda Diego in 1575.
 Alonso Gonzalez, son of Gonzalo Martín Garnamete and Maria Alonso. He had the permission to go to Santo Domingo on September 15, 1536.
 Martin Gutierrez, 25 years old, went to Costa Rica in issuing Artieda Diego in 1575.

Landmarks 

 Parish Church Nuestra Señora de la Candelaria. It was built by masters of Zafra in the late 16th century on a previous one of Templar origin, because in it there are two stone doorways bricked up on bricks placed in the XIV.
 Chapel of the Holy Christ of Mercy. Near the church, Moorish origin.
 Chapel of San Isidro. Modern style, built on a previous call of the Holy Spirit, in which land was the old cemetery.
 Ermita de la Langosta. There is a legend that says that this shrine is said divine intervention to undo a plague that was devastating to the fields.
 Cross Almendral 16th century. Stone monument at the top represents a cross. Located in the west end of town, formerly the closest point to Almendral and post arrival of ancient processions which started from this village, hence its name.
 Turret. Near the church there was a fort which was demolished in 1841. Currently remains a tower between the houses.
 Olive Oil Mill. Built in the eighteenth century was built by Bishop Murphy Malaguilla for devout Carmelite convent of Badajoz, which is often mistaken for a convent.
 Lagoons. Laguna Grande and El carril: Located in the vicinity, belonging to the Albuera lagoon system. In ancient times used to be a fishing, livestock watering and walking.
 Fountains, Albercones and Streams. The major sources are mainly two: one located in the Village Square and another source in the NE part of town, and 4 smaller tubes. Notably Hawk Creek, which runs through the eastern fringe of the town.

Notable residents 
 Bartolomé Martínez Menacho, Bishop of Panama and the Archbishop of Bogotá
 Bartolomé Torres Naharro, writer of the Spanish Golden Age
 Juan Barjola, contemporary painter artist.

Traditions 

 Every Christmas the town celebrates with a live nativity scene on the streets.
 Medieval Markets.
 Matanza.
 Country pilgrimages.
 Festivals.
 Amateur dramatics.

References

External links 
 Ayuntamiento de Torre de Miguel Sesmero .
 La televisión de Torre de Miguel Sesmero 
 Buenos días, Buena Gente 
 Website
 Group on Facebook
 Page on Facebook
 

Municipalities in the Province of Badajoz